Dwight/South Portage Water Aerodrome  is located  west of Dwight, Ontario, Canada.

See also
 Dwight Aerodrome
 Dwight (Fox Point) Water Aerodrome

References

Registered aerodromes in Ontario
Seaplane bases in Ontario